Leon Duray (April 30, 1894 Cleveland, Ohio -   May 12, 1956 Twentynine Palms, California) was an American racecar driver active in the 1920s. Born George Stewart, and nicknamed "The Flying Frenchman," he legally changed his name in tribute to fellow driver Arthur Duray.

Indianapolis 500 results

Duray's starts from 1925 thru 1929 stood as the best five race starting streak from 1929 until 1990, when his record was bested by Rick Mears. His streak currently stands as 3rd best in "500" history.
Leon Duray "Jigger" Sirois, an USAC Indy car driver active in the 1960s and 1970s, was named after Leon Duray.

References

1894 births
1956 deaths
Indianapolis 500 drivers
Indianapolis 500 polesitters
Sportspeople from Cleveland
Racing drivers from Ohio
AAA Championship Car drivers